José Luis Contreras Coeto (born 30 March 1964) is a Mexican politician affiliated with the National Action Party. He served as a federal deputy of the LX Legislature of the Mexican Congress representing Puebla, and previously served as the municipal president of Tepeaca from 2002 to 2005.

References

1964 births
Living people
National Action Party (Mexico) politicians
21st-century Mexican politicians
Deputies of the LX Legislature of Mexico
Members of the Chamber of Deputies (Mexico) for Puebla
Municipal presidents in Puebla
Politicians from Puebla
People from Puebla (city)